Williamsburg County is a county located in the U.S. state of South Carolina. As of the 2020 census its population was 31,026. The county seat and largest city is Kingstree. After a previous incarnation of Williamsburg County, the current county was created in 1804.

History 
In 1867 the United States military oversaw the registering of voters in the county in preparation for the election of a new "reconstruction" government.  In the Williamsburg District, there were 800 whites and 1,725 African-Americans who were eligible to vote under the new system.  A convention was held to organize a new constitutions for the state of South Carolina, the Williamsburg District was represented by William Darrington who was a white reverend from the Williamsburg District who had opposed slavery before the war as well as C.M. Olsen and Stephen A. Swails who were both African-American.  Darrington led a prayer at the opening of the convention on February 14 of 1868.

In 1868 the state constitution abolished the parishes and designated judicial districts formally as counties thus transforming the "Williamsburg District" into "Williamsburg County."

In 1868 an election was held in which all men older than 21 years of age who had never been convicted of committing a felony nor were "prohibited on account of service under Confederate Government" were allowed to vote.  This was a form of direct democratic election which had been set up by the reconstruction government of South Carolina.  Almost all voters in this election were African American.  No one who fought for the Confederacy was allowed to vote in the election.  Many African-American officials were elected.  Stephen A. Swails was an educated black man from Pennsylvania who had fought in the U.S. military in the 54th Massachusetts Infantry Regiment during the civil war, and who was elected to represent Williamsburg County in the South Carolina State Senate.  F.H. Frost, J. Pendergrass and Fortune Guilds were three black men chosen to represent Williamsburg County in the South Carolina State House of Representatives.  F. H. Frost was a black man elected as school commissioner.  F.H. Swails was a black man elected as an auditor of Williamsburg County.  C. Rasted and F.H. Frost were two black men who were elected as the assessors for Williamsburg County's county government.  W.W. Ward was a white abolitionist from Massachusetts who was elected to be the sheriff of Williamsburg County, F.C. Cooper was a white abolitionist Quaker from Pennsylvania who was elected to be the clerk of the court of Williamsburg County and C.H. Pettingil, a Union Army officer from Boston, Massachusetts and former member of the Massachusetts Abolition Society who was elected as Williamsburg County's state constable representing the county in South Carolina's state government.  In all of these elections local whites from South Carolina who had, by coincidence, not fought in the confederate military did run, however every single one of them lost.  Every single man elected from Williamsburg County in this election was a member of the Republican Party.

During this time, State Senator Stephen A. Swails also served as the mayor of Kingstree from 1868 until 1878.  While mayor, Swails published and edited a newspaper called the Williamsburg Republican, he also started a law firm.  Swails became the most prominent member of the South Carolina senate, the president pro tempore, placing him in control of all bills that passed through the state legislature. Committed to universal education, he played a critical part in transforming The South Carolina College from a school for planter elite into the integrated University of South Carolina.

Geography

State and local protected areas 
 Moore Farms Botanical Garden (part)
 Wee Tee Wildlife Management Area (part)

Major water bodies 
 Black Mingo Swamp
 Black River
 Great Pee Dee River
 Lake Swamp
 Muddy Creek
 Santee River
 Singleton Swamp

Adjacent counties 
 Florence County - north
 Marion County - northeast
 Georgetown County - east
 Berkeley County - south
 Clarendon County - west

Major highways

Major infrastructure 
 Kingstree Station
 Williamsburg Regional Airport

Demographics

2020 census

As of the 2020 United States Census, there were 31,026 people, 12,686 households, and 8,066 families residing in the county.

2010 census
As of the 2010 United States Census, there were 34,423 people, 13,007 households, and 8,854 families living in the county. The racial makeup of the county was 65.8% black or African American, 31.8% white, 0.4% Asian, 0.3% American Indian, 1.0% from other races, and 0.8% from two or more races. Those of Hispanic or Latino origin made up 2.0% of the population. In terms of ancestry, and 4.6% were American.

Of the 13,007 households, 33.2% had children under the age of 18 living with them, 40.0% were married couples living together, 23.0% had a female householder with no husband present, 31.9% were non-families, and 29.0% of all households were made up of individuals. The average household size was 2.53 and the average family size was 3.13. The median age was 40.2 years.

The median income for a household in the county was $24,191 and the median income for a family was $33,705. Males had a median income of $37,678 versus $22,303 for females. The per capita income for the county was $13,513. About 26.5% of families and 32.9% of the population were below the poverty line, including 45.6% of those under age 18 and 27.5% of those age 65 or over.

2000 census
As of the census of 2000, there were 37,217 people, 13,714 households, and 10,052 families living in the county. The population density was 40 people per square mile (15/km2). There were 15,552 housing units at an average density of 17 per square mile (6/km2). The racial makeup of the county was 66.26% Black or African American, 32.74% White, 0.16% Native American, 0.20% Asian, 0.16% from other races, and 0.48% from two or more races. 0.73% of the population were Hispanic or Latino of any race.

There were 13,714 households, out of which 34.50% had children under the age of 18 living with them, 46.30% were married couples living together, 22.40% had a female householder with no husband present, and 26.70% were non-families. 24.90% of all households were made up of individuals, and 10.40% had someone living alone who was 65 years of age or older. The average household size was 2.69 and the average family size was 3.22.

In the county, the population was spread out, with 28.60% under the age of 18, 9.00% from 18 to 24, 25.70% from 25 to 44, 23.60% from 45 to 64, and 13.00% who were 65 years of age or older. The median age was 36 years. For every 100 females there were 87.90 males. For every 100 females age 18 and over, there were 81.50 males.

The median income for a household in the county was $24,214, and the median income for a family was $30,379. Males had a median income of $26,680 versus $18,202 for females. The per capita income for the county was $12,794. About 23.70% of families and 27.90% of the population were below the poverty line, including 36.10% of those under age 18 and 25.90% of those age 65 or over.

Law and Government

Law enforcement
In 2015, Sheriff Michael Johnson was charged with conspiracy to commit wire fraud, and sentenced to 30 months imprisonment. Johnson, with a co-conspirator, filed false reports of identity theft in order to raise individuals' credit scores, in exchange for up to a thousand dollars in payment.

Politics
Prior to 1948, Williamsburg County was a Democratic Party stronghold similar to the rest of the Solid South, with Democratic presidential candidates receiving near-unanimous margins of victory in most years. The twenty years from 1948 to 1968 were a highly transitional time for the politics of South Carolina & Williamsburg County, largely in part due to the Democratic Party's increasing support for African-American civil rights & enfranchisement. Dixiecrats managed to carry the county twice, while Republicans managed to carry the county three times in this timespan, while increased black registration led to Democrat Hubert Humphrey winning the county in 1968. Since 1968, the majority African-American county has only backed a Republican once in 1972, when Richard Nixon won the county as he swept every county statewide in the midst of a 49-state national landslide.

Communities

City
 Kingstree (county seat and largest city)

Towns
 Andrews (mostly in Georgetown County)
 Greeleyville
 Hemingway
 Lane
 Stuckey

Unincorporated communities

 Cades
 Gourdin
 Hebron
 Indiantown
 Nesmith
 Outland
 Rhems
 Salters
 Trio
 Piney Forest

See also
 List of counties in South Carolina
 National Register of Historic Places listings in Williamsburg County, South Carolina
 List of South Carolina state forests
 Chaloklowa Chickasaw, state-recognized group that resides in the county

References

Further reading
 History of Williamsburg by William Willis Boddie, 1923
 The Life of Francis Marion by William Gilmore Simms (Project Gutenberg), March 1997

External links

 
 

 
1804 establishments in South Carolina
Populated places established in 1804
Black Belt (U.S. region)
Majority-minority counties in South Carolina